Chadarangam is an Indian Telugu-language political thriller web series that streamed on Zee5. This political drama series is written and directed by Raj Anantha and produced by Vishnu Manchu from 24 frames factory. The series has Srikanth, Ravi Prakash, Sunainaa, Jeeva, Chalapathi Rao and Nagineedu playing important roles.

Cast
 Srikanth as Pemmasani Gangadhar Rao
 Ravi Prakash as Bapineedu
 Nuthikattu Trinetrudu as Gangadhar Rao's son
 Sunainaa as Kranthi
 Chalapathi Rao as Guru Murthy
 Jeeva as Yogeswar Rao
 Nagineedu as Erra Rama Krishna Rao
 Ramya Pasupuleti as Paro
 Kausalya as Bhavani
 Subhash Gupta as Rathore
 Jayasri Rachakonda as Vasundhara Dhar

Season 1

Episodes

References

External links
 Official Website at ZEE5

Indian drama web series
Indian thriller television series
Telugu-language web series
2020 web series debuts
ZEE5 original programming